The 1947 Wightman Cup was the 19th edition of the annual women's team tennis competition between the United States and Great Britain. It was held at the West Side Tennis Club in Forest Hills, Queens in New York City in the United States.

References

1947
1947 in tennis
1947 in American tennis
1947 in British sport
1947 in women's tennis